R. Zamora Linmark, born in Manila, is a Filipino American poet, novelist, and playwright. He earned a bachelor's degree from the University of Hawaii in Honolulu. He is the recipient of a Japan-United States Friendship Commission, a winner of a National Endowment for the Arts creative writing fellowship in poetry (2001), and was a Fulbright Foundation Senior Lecturer/Researcher in the Philippines (2005-2006). He was a Distinguished Visiting Professor in Creative Writing at the University of Hawaii and University of Miami. His works include Prime-Time Apparitions (2005), The Evolution of a Sigh (2008), Drive-By Vigils (2011), Rolling the R’s (1995), Leche (2011), and The Importance of Being Wilde at Heart (2019); themes involving ethnic and sexual identity are common throughout.

Professional life
His first, a novel, Rolling the R's was released by Kaya Press in 1995.  Linmark then went on to adapt it for the stage, receiving a world premiere production from Kumu Kahua in 2008.

Hanging Loose Press published two of Linmark's poetry collections: Prime Time Apparitions (2005) and The Evolution of a Sigh (2008).  Of his first collection of poems, Prime Time Apparitions, poet Mark Doty wrote: "...witty and disenchanted, sexy and touched, jangled with longing and the crazed changes the wild new world works." Both of his collections of poetry are available from Hanging Loose Press.

Personal life
In addition to having lived in Tokyo in the past, he currently divides his time between Manila and Honolulu.

Bibliography
 Rolling the R's. Kaya Press (1995)
 Prime Time Apparitions. Hanging Loose Press (2005)
 The Evolution of a Sigh. Hanging Loose Press (2008)
 Leche. Coffee House Press (2011)
The Importance of Being Wilde at Heart Delacorte Press (2019)

Sources

Living people
20th-century American novelists
American male novelists
Filipino emigrants to the United States
Year of birth missing (living people)
American gay writers
American LGBT poets
American LGBT novelists
20th-century American poets
American male poets
20th-century American male writers
American writers of Filipino descent
Gay poets